The HS.404 is an autocannon originally designed and produced by Spanish/French company Hispano-Suiza in the mid-1930s. It was widely used as an aircraft, naval and land-based weapon by French, British, American and other military services, particularly during  World War II. The cannon is also referred to as Birkigt type 404, after its designer Marc Birkigt and later versions based on British development are known as 20 mm Hispano.

Firing a 20 mm calibre projectile, it delivered a significant load of explosive from a relatively light weapon. This made it an ideal anti-aircraft weapon for mounting on light vehicles, as well as a fighter aircraft gun, supplementing or replacing the 7.62 mm (.30 calibre) and .303 inch (7.7 mm) machine guns commonly used in military aircraft of the 1930s. The HS.404 was produced by the French subsidiary of Hispano-Suiza, and under license by a variety of companies in other countries.

Development

From Oerlikon to Hispano
The first widely used 20 mm aircraft cannon was the  Becker model, introduced into German service in World War I. The Becker introduced the  advanced primer ignition blowback (API) design for autocannons, a concept that was quickly taken up by other companies. Notable among these was the Swiss Oerlikon FF S, which was based on the Becker but introduced a number of improvements. In the 1930s, Hispano-Suiza was asked to develop a 20 mm cannon to fire through the propeller shaft (as a moteur-canon) of a gear-reduction inline aviation engine like the Hispano-Suiza 8BeC. They took out a license on the Oerlikon FF S and made minor modifications to produce the Hispano-Suiza Automatic Cannon Type HS.7 and HS.9. Shortly after production began, the Hispano-Suiza and Oerlikon companies disagreed over patent rights and their business connection came to an end.

In 1933, the chief engineer of Hispano-Suiza, Marc Birkigt, began work on the design of a new weapon to replace the Oerlikon contract, based on a locking mechanism patented in 1919 by the American machine-gun designer Carl Swebilius. The result was the Type 404 or HS.404. While the HS.404 resembled the parent Oerlikon FF S in many respects, its repeating mechanism was a gas-operated locking bolt.

On firing the 404, when the projectile passes a hole cut in the barrel, about half way along its length, high pressure gas behind the projectile is siphoned off and operates a piston that drives a rod, running along the top of the barrel, back against a cam on the bolt, unlocking it and allowing the remaining high pressure gases in the barrel to propel it and the spent cartridge backwards in a delayed sequence that allows the bolt to remain closed until the bullet has exited from the barrel. This maximizes muzzle velocity and since the bolt was locked during firing, it could be lighter than that of the Oerlikon, thus facilitating an increase in rate of fire to 700 rounds per minute (rpm), a gain of about 200 rpm. In 1938, Birkigt patented it and started production in their Geneva factory.

Anti-aircraft gun

The HS.404's predecessor, the Oerlikon type S auto-cannon, was rather heavy, and the movement of the heavy bolt made it best suited in static and maritime anti-aircraft defence. The lighter bolt of the HS.404 made it well suited to mounting on vehicles. The M16, an anti-aircraft version of the M3 Half-track, could be equipped with single or double American made copies of the Hispano-Suiza auto-cannon. This variant of the M3 Half-track was used by US and Commonwealth forces late in the Second World War, in the Korean War and was further developed by Israel in the post-war era.

Aircraft gun
In 1938, an aircraft based version of the HS.404 was produced at the request of the French government. It was installed on a wide range of pre-war French fighter aircraft, notably in installations firing through the propeller shaft of the Hispano-Suiza 12Y engine, a system referred to as a moteur-canon (engine cannon). Due to the closed-bolt design the cannon was also suitable for synchronisation gear. The HS.404 was fed by drum magazines that could accommodate 60 (or in a fixed mount 160) rounds.. Since in most installations the latter was more popular, the small ammunition capacity was a weakness. In 1940, Hispano-Suiza was developing a belt-feeding system, as well as derivatives of the HS.404 in heavier calibres such as 23 mm but these projects were halted with the German occupation of France.

British production
Before the Second World War, the United Kingdom had embarked on a programme to develop cannon-armed fighters. They acquired a licence to build the HS.404, which entered production as the Hispano Mk.I intended as aeroplane armament. Its first use was in the Westland Whirlwind of 1940 and later in the more powerful Bristol Beaufighter, providing the Royal Air Force (RAF) with powerful cannon-armed interceptors. The experience of the Battle of Britain had shown the batteries of eight rifle-calibre machine guns to be inadequate and prompted the adoption of autocannon armament for the primary portion of RAF fighters. The Beaufighter highlighted the need for a belt feed mechanism; as a night fighter the 60-round drums needed to be replaced in the dark by the Radar/Wireless Operator, often while the aircraft was manoeuvring. The early trial installations in the Hawker Hurricane and Supermarine Spitfire had shown a tendency for the gun to jam during combat manoeuvres, leading to some official doubt as to the suitability of cannon as the sole main armament. This led to the Air Ministry for a brief period specifying 12-machine gun armament for new fighters.

A suitable belt-feeding system was developed by Martin-Baker and the new design was adopted by the RAF and Fleet Air Arm in 1941 in a slightly modified form as the Hispano Mk.II. Four cannons replaced the eight .303 Browning machine guns in the Hurricane and in some tropical versions of the Spitfire, becoming standard armament in later fighters. Most other Spitfires had only two cannons because the outboard cannon tended to freeze at high altitudes. These were complemented with four 0.303 calibre (7.7mm) or two 0.50 calibre (12.7mm) machine guns.

The British were concerned their production would be inadequate and licensed production of the Hispano to the US but this production never became satisfactory and the British eventually gave up on the US versions. British production was eventually increased to the point where this was no longer necessary. The ultimate version of the British wartime Hispanos was the Hispano Mk. V, which had a shorter barrel, and lacked the cocking cylinder thus requiring manual cocking before flight. It was lighter and had a higher rate of fire (desirable in aircraft armament), although at the expense of some muzzle velocity. The shorter barrel meant that the weapon could be housed within the wing of a fighter plane, reducing drag and making the gun less vulnerable to freezing and mechanical stress. One of the main British fighters to use the Mk. V was the Hawker Tempest Mk. V Series II, which mounted two cannon in each wing. Ammunition types available included Semi-Armour Piercing, Incendiary (SAPI) and High Explosive, Incendiary (HEI). Around 42,500 Hispano cannon of various marks were manufactured by Birmingham Small Arms (BSA).

US production

The British version was also licensed for use in the United States as the M1, with the United States Army Air Corps (USAAC) and U.S. Navy, which concluded that a single HS404 is analogous to three .50 machine guns in firepower while weighing less than twice as much, planning to switch to the 20 mm calibre as soon as the gun could be produced in sufficient numbers. In 1941 a very large building program was established, along with the production of ammunition. When delivered, the guns proved to be extremely unreliable and suffered a considerable number of misfires due to the round being lightly struck by the firing pin. The British were interested in using this weapon to ease the demand on production in England but after receiving the M1 they were disappointed. British wing-mounted fighter weapons by this period were cocked on the ground by the aircraft armourers before flight, the pneumatic cocking mechanism used previously being regarded as unnecessary weight and detrimental to aircraft performance; any stoppage in flight made the gun unusable until it could be cleared on the ground. The misfires also had the tendency to cause aircraft with wing-mounted guns to yaw away from the wing with the failed gun when the guns were fired, due to the unequal recoil, throwing off the pilot's aim.

In April 1942 a copy of the British Mk.II was sent to the U.S. for comparison. The British version used a slightly shorter chamber and did not have the same problems as the U.S. version of the cannon. The U.S. declined to modify the chamber of their version but nonetheless made other modifications to create the unreliable M2. By late 1942 the USAAF had 40 million rounds of ammunition stored but the guns remained unsuitable. The U.S. Navy had been trying to switch to using cannon on all its combat aircraft throughout the war but the conversion never occurred. As late as December 1945 the U. S. Army Chief of Ordnance was still attempting to complete additional changes to the design to allow it to enter service.  Some variations of the 20 mm guns used on the Lockheed P-38 Lightning aircraft were produced by International Harvester. The P-38's nose-mounted M2 featured a built-in cocking system and could simply be re-cocked in flight after a misfire, which made the misfires less of a problem than with other aircraft.

The U.S. followed the British development closely and when the Mk.V was designed, the Americans followed suit with the A/N M3 but unreliability continued. After the war the United States Air Force (USAF) adopted a version of the M3 cannon as the M24, similar in most respects except for the use of the addition of electrical cocking, allowing the gun to re-cock over a lightly struck round. The problems of the American weapons led to most US fighters being equipped with the AN/M2 .50 cal Browning light-barrel machine gun throughout the war.

Post-war development
After the war, the Hispano variants disappeared fairly quickly as fighter armament due to the introduction of revolver cannon, based on the prototype versions of the un-built German wartime Mauser MG 213 design. The British introduced the powerful revolving 30 mm ADEN cannon in most of their post-war aircraft, while the French used the similar DEFA cannon, firing similar ammunition. The USAF introduced the 20 mm M39 cannon to replace the M24, while the Navy combined the original Hispano design with a lighter round for better muzzle velocity in the Colt Mk 12 cannon. As a ground vehicle-mounted gun, either anti-aircraft or as a general-purpose autocannon, the HS.404 lasted into the 1960s. A powered turret variant is still in production in Honduras and is used as a light anti-aircraft gun by the army and navy in several nations. The AN/M3 was developed into the Mk12 Colt 20 mm automatic cannon, one of the main weapons on boats of the Mobile Riverine Force in the Vietnam War and also used on some larger amphibious ships.

Properties
Lengths of the projectiles varied with type but were set to variable depth in the casing to produce a total full round length of  regardless of projectile type. Rate of fire was between 600 and 850 rounds per minute. The British Mk V and American M3/M24 weapons were lighter and had higher rates of fire than the early HS.404 guns.

Users

France

 HS.404
 Bloch MB.152
 Breguet 693
 Dewoitine D.500
 Dewoitine D.520
 Lioré et Olivier LeO 45
 Morane-Saulnier M.S.406
 Potez 631

UK & other Commonwealth countries
 Hispano Mk. I
 Gloster F.9/37—a design not taken into service
 Westland Whirlwind—the RAF's first cannon-armed fighter.
 Bristol Beaufighter—early aircraft

 Hispano Mk. II
 Blackburn Firebrand
 Blackburn Firecrest
 Bristol Beaufighter
 CAC Boomerang
 Consolidated Liberator I (4 guns on 20 aircraft)
 de Havilland Mosquito
 Douglas Boston III (Intruder)
 Fairey Firefly
 Gloster Meteor
 Hawker Hurricane Mk IIC and IV
 Hawker Tempest Mk V Srs I
 Hawker Typhoon Mk IB
 Martin-Baker MB 3—prototype
 North American Mustang IA
 Supermarine Spitfire Marks V to Mark 20

 Hispano Mk. V
 Aérospatiale Alouette III (South African Air Force cabin mounted)
 Avro Lincoln (when fitted with mid-upper turrets)
 Avro Shackleton
 Bristol Brigand
 de Havilland Hornet & Sea Hornet
 de Havilland Vampire
 de Havilland Venom & de Havilland Sea Venom
 English Electric Canberra B.Mk.6 & B(I).Mk.8
 Hawker Fury & Sea Fury
 Hawker Sea Hawk
 Hawker Tempest Mk V Srs II and subsequent Marks
 Martin-Baker MB 5—prototype
 Saunders-Roe SR.A/1
 Supermarine Attacker
 Supermarine Seafang
 Supermarine Spiteful
 Supermarine Spitfire (late Merlin-powered variants)#Mk XVI (type 361) Mk.XVIe
 Supermarine Spitfire (Griffon powered variants)#Mk XIVe Mk.XIVe,XVIII,21,22,24
 Westland Welkin
 Westland Wyvern

United States

 M1
 Bell P-39 Airacobra - some early 20mm-armed models and RAF Bell Airacobra I
 Lockheed P-38 Lightning - some early 20mm-armed models and RAF Lockheed Lightning I
 AN/M2
 Bell P-400 (P-39 Airacobra diverted from export for USAAF usage)
 Boeing B-29 Superfortress - In tail gunner position with two 0.5 in machine guns
 Curtiss SB2C Helldiver
 North American P-51 Mustang - NA-91 models were fitted with four AN/M2s.
 Douglas A-1 Skyraider
 Douglas F3D Skyknight
 Grumman F6F-5N Hellcat
 Grumman F9F Panther
 Grumman F-9 Cougar
 Lockheed P-38 Lightning
 Northrop P-61 Black Widow
 Chance Vought F4U-1C Corsair
 T31
 Martin AM-1 Mauler
 Douglas A2D Skyshark
 AN/M3
 F4U-4B and all following versions
 Chance Vought F6U Pirate
 Chance Vought F7U Cutlass
 Douglas A-3 Skywarrior
 Grumman F9F Panther
 Grumman F8F Bearcat - used M3s from the F8F-1B on
 Grumman F-9 Cougar
 M24
 Convair B-36
 Boeing B-47 Stratojet
 Douglas B-66 Destroyer
 Northrop F-89C Scorpion

Yugoslavia
 HS.404
 Ikarus IK-2
 Rogožarski IK-3

Sweden
 LvAkan m/41 "HS 404" (anti air cannon)
 Akan m/41A "HS 404" (built in Sweden)
 Saab 21 "J 21A-1"
 Saab 18 "T 18B"
 Saab 24 "not built"
 Akan m/46A "Hispano Mk. II Mod 46"
 J 28 (de Havilland Vampire FB 1 "J 28A")
 J 30 (de Havilland Mosquito NF.XIX)
 Akan m/47B "Hispano Mk. V" 150-round magazine. Some built in Sweden.
 J 28 (de Havilland Vampire FB.50 "J 28B", two-seater DH 115 "SK 28C")
 J 33 (de Havilland Venom NF 51)
 Akan m/47C "Hispano Mk. V" 180-round magazine. Some built in Sweden.
 Saab 29 Tunnan "A, B, D, E, F"
 Akan m/47D "Hispano Mk. V" Initially 130-round belt-fed (HE) and 10-round magazines (AP). Later 30-round box magazine (MPHC-T).
 Pansarbandvagn 302 tracked armoured personnel carrier. The vehicle used a single akan m/47 cannon re-purposed from scrapped Saab 29 and Venom aircraft.
 Pansarterrängbil 203A wheeled armoured personnel carrier. The 203A reuses old Pansarbandvagn 302 turrets.

Switzerland
 20 mm Flugzeugmotorkanone Hispano-suiza FM-45 HS and 20 mm Flugzeugflügelkanone Hispano-suiza FF-45 HS. Swiss variant with 780 rpm and 875 m/s velocity.
 Doflug D.3802 "D.3802A"
 Doflug D.3803
 EKW C-3604
 20 mm Kanone 1948/73 "Hispano Mk. V"
 Schützenpanzer 63/73 American-built M113 APC's equipped with the same Swedish turret as Pansarbandvagn 302

Argentina
 Hispano Mk. II
 I.Ae. 24 Calquin
 Hispano Mk. V
 I.Ae. 30 Ñancú
 FMA IAe 33 Pulqui II

Specifications HS.404
 Type: single-barrel automatic cannon
 Calibre: 20 mm × 110 (0.79 in)
 Operation: gas operated, delayed blowback
 Length without muzzle brake: 
 Length with muzzle brake: 
 Weight without drum magazine: 
 Weight (complete): 
 Rate of fire: 600–700 rpm
 Muzzle velocity: 
 Recoil force:  with muzzle brake
 Ammunition: Ball, Incendiary, HE (High Explosive)
 Projectile weight: HE and HEI: , AP-T: 
 HE and HEI rounds explosive filler:

Ammunition

United States

World War II
Ammunition was shipped in rectangular 10-shell fiberboard cartons. There were 12 cartons per metal-lined wooden packing crate (120 rounds).
 20mm Ball Mk. I
 Weight (Projectile): 
 Weight (Complete Round): each.
 Weight (Packing Crate):.
 Volume (Packing Crate): 1.45 Cubic Feet.
 20mm High Explosive - Incendiary Mk. I
 Fuze: No.253 Mk.IA Direct Action (Percussion) Fuze.
 Weight (Projectile): 
 Weight (Payload):  of high explosive and incendiary fillers.
 Weight (Complete Round): each.
 Weight (Packing Crate): .
 Volume (Packing Crate): 1.45 Cubic Feet.
 20mm Armour Piercing - Tracer M75
 Weight (Projectile): 
 Weight (Complete Round): each.
 Weight (Packing Crate): .
 Volume (Packing Crate):  1.45 Cubic Feet.

Post-War
The M90 series of shells were ballistically matched to make it easier to use different types without losing accuracy. Ammunition was shipped in 25-round metal canisters. There were 6 metal canisters per wooden crate (150 rounds).
 20mm Drill M18A2
 Weight (Projectile): ?
 Weight (Complete Round): ? each.
 Weight (Packing Crate): ?
 Volume (Packing Crate): 1.5 Cubic Feet.
 20mm HEFI-SAP (High Explosive Fragmentation Incendiary-Semi Armor-Piercing) M18A2
 20mm Armour Piercing - Tracer M95 (T9E5)
 Weight (Projectile): 
 Weight (Complete Round): each.
 Weight (Packing Crate):.
 Volume (Packing Crate): 1.5 Cubic Feet.
 20mm Incendiary M96 (T18)
 Weight (Projectile): 
 Weight (Complete Round): each.
 Weight (Packing Crate):.
 Volume (Packing Crate): 1.5 Cubic Feet.
 20mm High Explosive - Incendiary M97 (T23)
 Weight (Projectile): 
 Weight (Complete Round): each.
 Weight (Packing Crate):.
 Volume (Packing Crate): 1.5 Cubic Feet.
 20mm Training-Practice M99 (T24)
 Weight (Projectile): 
 Weight (Complete Round): each.
 Weight (Packing Crate):.
 Volume (Packing Crate): 1.5 Cubic Feet.

See also
 Hispano-Suiza HS.820
 MG FF cannon
 ShVAK cannon
 Nkm wz.38 FK

References
 War Department Training Manual TM 9-227 20mm M1 Automatic Gun & 20mm AN-M2 Automatic Gun (November 19, 1942).

External links 

 

20 mm artillery
Aircraft guns
Autocannon
World War II weapons of France
World War II weapons of the United Kingdom
World War II weapons of the United States
Military equipment introduced in the 1930s